Wayman is a ghost town in Pulaski County, Missouri, United States. The town was located southeast of Waynesville, Missouri and was named for a pioneer family. The town was abandoned by 1938. The town's original site is not known.

Notes

Former populated places in Pulaski County, Missouri
Ghost towns in Missouri